Mount Cangyan is a scenic area in Jingxing County,  Hebei Province, China, famous for its combination of natural mountain scenery with historical man-made structures.

Geography
The scenic area covers 63 square kilometres (180 square kilometres according to other counts). The vegetation of the area is a forest of cypress and blue sandalwood (Pteroceltis tatarinowii) trees.

History
The most famous building complex on Mount Cangyan is the Fortune Celebration Temple. It was first erected during the Sui Dynasty (late 6th to early 7th century) and is said to have been the place where Princess Nan Yang, the daughter of the Sui Emperor Yang, practiced Buddhism. The various structures of the Fortune Celebration Temple (the Tablets House, the Hall of the Heavenly Kings, the Hall of the Giant Buddha, the Bridge-Tower Hall, the Buddhist Canon Depository) are well integrated into the mountain topography. The central landmark of the complex is the Bridge-Tower Hall. As the name suggests, it is supported by a stone arch bridge spanning a narrow gorge. Under the bridge a stone staircase with more than 360 steps leads up to the summit.

Use in cinema
The first known use of the setting in cinema was in the award-winning 1954 film Letter with Feather. The 1986 Chinese TV series Journey to the West brought the mountain to the attention of Chinese audiences. It achieved equal fame in the West when it was used as a setting for the 2000 film Crouching Tiger, Hidden Dragon, which fictionally located it within the Wudang Mountains.

It was also used in the opening sequence of The Mummy: Tomb of the Dragon Emperor as well as lesser known Chinese films such as The Butterfly Lovers and Mulan: Rise of a Warrior.

External links
travelchinaguide

Mountains of Hebei
Cangyan Shan
Tourist attractions in Hebei
Shijiazhuang